The Department of Chemistry at the University of Manchester is one of the largest Departments of Chemistry in the United Kingdom, with over 600 undergraduate and more than 200 postgraduate research students.

The department has comprehensive academic coverage across the chemical sciences and in all the core sub-disciplines of chemistry, with over 120 postdoctoral researchers.

Current Management Board 
 Head of School: Prof. David Procter
 Head of Education: Dr. Alan Brisdon
 Undergraduate Program Director: Dr. Andrew Regan
 Subject Lead (Inorganic): Prof. David Collison 
 Subject Lead (Organic): Dr. Andrew Regan
 Subject Lead (Physical): Prof. Nick Lockyer
 Head of Teaching and Scholarship: Dr. Jenny Slaughter
 PASS Management Staff: Dr. Nicholas Weise
 Undergraduate Admissions Tutor: Dr. Sam Hay
 International Studies: Dr. Lu Shin Wong

Notable faculty
 The department employs 34 full-time Professors and 11 Emeritus Professors including:
 David Procter, Head of School, and Professor of Organic Chemistry.
 Nikolas Kaltsoyannis, Ex-Head of School, and Professor of Computational and Theoretical Chemistry.
 Richard Winpenny, Ex-Head of School, and Professor of Inorganic Chemistry.
 David Leigh, FRS, Sir Samuel Hall Chair of Chemistry
 Gareth A. Morris, FRS, Professor of Physical Chemistry

Emeritus

The School is also home to a number of Emeritus Professors, pursuing their research interests after their formal retirement including:
 John Joule, Emeritus Professor
 William Byers Brown, Emeritus Professor and first Professor of Computational Chemistry in the department

History of chemistry in Manchester

 
Manchester has a long and distinguished history of Chemistry. John Dalton founded modern Chemistry in 1803 with his atomic theory. William Henry (1774 – 1836) was a Manchester chemist who developed what is known today as Henry's Law. James Joule pioneered the science of thermodynamics in the 1840s while working in Manchester. In the basement of the Royal Manchester Institution a laboratory was installed by Lyon Playfair who worked there briefly as Professor of Chemistry after he left Thomson's of Clitheroe. He was succeeded by Frederick Crace Calvert who made phenol which was used by Joseph Lister as an antiseptic.
 Carl Schorlemmer, was appointed the first UK Professor of Organic Chemistry in 1874.

The teaching of chemistry in Owens College began in 1851 in a house in St John Street and was later transferred to the main college building in Quay Street. When the college removed to the present university site in 1873 the chemical laboratory was designed by Henry Roscoe. To this was added in 1895 the Schorlemmer laboratory for organic chemistry and in 1904 three more laboratories were added; these were the Dalton and Perkin laboratories and the Schunck laboratory which was brought from Kersal and rebuilt. The Morley laboratories (1909) provided further accommodation for organic chemistry. In October 1909 Rona Robinson and two other women were arrested for dressing in full academic regalia and interrupting a speech by the chancellor of the university at the celebration of the opening of the new chemical laboratories. They were demanding that the chancellor speak out against the force-feeding of imprisoned suffragette alumni of Manchester who were on hunger strike. The police were particularly rough with the women that day and the chancellor was sufficiently moved by the women's protest to pressure the university into not pressing charges, thus preventing Rona from going to prison again.

After the 2nd World War three more laboratories were built further down Burlington Street; these were the Dixon Laboratory (1946), the Robinson Laboratory (1950) and the Lapworth Laboratory (1950); all three were vacated in the 1960s when the present building in Brunswick Street was available. The architect for the present chemistry building was H. S. Fairhurst & Son.

Professors

Professors at Owens College and the Victoria University of Manchester:
E. Frankland, 1851–57
H. E. Roscoe, 1857–86
C. Schorlemmer, 1874-92 (organic chemistry)
H. B. Dixon, 1887-1922
W. H. Perkin, 1892-1912 (organic chemistry)
A. Lapworth, 1913-22 (organic chemistry)
A. Lapworth, 1922–35
R. Robinson, 1923-28 (organic chemistry)
I. M. Heilbron, 1933-38 (organic chemistry)
M. Polanyi, 1933-48 (physical chemistry)
A. R. Todd, 1938-44 (organic chemistry)
E. L. Hirst, 1942-47 (organic chemistry)
E. R. H. Jones, 1947- ? (organic chemistry)
M. G. Evans, 1948- ?

Alumni

Other distinguished alumni and former staff from the school of Chemistry include:

 Melvin Calvin, worked in Manchester from 1935 to 1937, awarded the Nobel Prize in Chemistry in 1961
 Michael Polanyi, Professor of Chemistry
 Arthur Harden, awarded the Nobel Prize in Chemistry in 1929
 Norman Haworth, awarded Nobel Prize in Chemistry in 1937
 George de Hevesy, awarded the  Nobel Prize in Chemistry in 1943
 James Lovelock FRS, undergraduate in Chemistry, graduating in 1941
 John Charles Polanyi, awarded the Nobel Prize in Chemistry in 1986
 Robert Robinson awarded the Nobel Prize in Chemistry in 1947
 Ernest Rutherford, awarded the Nobel Prize in Chemistry in 1908
 Michael Smith, completed PhD in Manchester, awarded the Nobel Prize in Chemistry in 1993
 Alexander R. Todd, Baron Todd, awarded the Nobel Prize in Chemistry in 1957

See also Notable chemists (and biologists) at the University of Manchester

References

Campbell, Colin (1939) "The chemistry department", in: The Journal of the University of Manchester; vol. 1, no. 3, pp. 39–45.

Chemistry education
Chemistry
Professional education in Manchester